Tsurumi may refer to:

Places (鶴見)
Tsurumi-ku, Yokohama
Tsurumi Station
Tsurumi Line
Tsurumi River, Kanagawa
Tsurumi-ku, Osaka
Tsurumi, Ōita

People with the surname
Koko Tsurumi (鶴見虹子, born 1992), gymnast
Shuji Tsurumi (鶴見修治, born 1938), gymnast
Shunsuke Tsurumi (鶴見俊輔, 1922–2015), philosopher
Yoshihiro Tsurumi (霍見芳浩, born 1935), economist
Roppyaku Tsurumi
Shingo Tsurumi (born 1964), Japanese actor
Tomoyoshi Tsurumi (born 1979), Japanese footballer
Toshitaka Tsurumi (born 1986), Japanese footballer

Japanese-language surnames